Events from the year 1863 in France.

Incumbents
 Monarch – Napoleon III

Events
15 January - French forces bombard Veracruz, during the French intervention in Mexico.
16 March - French siege of Puebla begins.
14 April - Treaty of Hué is signed between Vietnam and the French Empire.
30 April - Battle of Camarón, between the French Foreign Legion and the Mexican army: Mexican victory, but successful French delaying action.
17 May - Puebla surrenders to the French.
7 June - French troops enter Mexico City.
21–22 June - Legislative election, first round.
5–6 July - Legislative election, second round.
First outbreak of phylloxera on the European mainland observed in the vineyards of the southern Rhône region.
The recipe for the herbal liqueur Bénédictine is devised by Alexandre Le Grand in Fécamp.
The Paris Observatory begins to publish weather maps.

Arts and literature
31 January - Jules Verne's scientifically inspired novel Five Weeks in a Balloon (Cinq semaines en ballon) is published by Pierre-Jules Hetzel in Paris; it will be the first of Verne's Voyages Extraordinaires.
30 September - Georges Bizet's opera, Les pêcheurs de perles receives its première at the Théâtre Lyrique in Paris.
4 November - Hector Berlioz's opera Les Troyens receives its première at the Théâtre Lyrique.

Births
1 January - Pierre de Coubertin, historian and founder of the International Olympic Committee (died 1937)
16 April - Émile Friant, painter (died 1932)
26 May - Charles-Victor Langlois, historian and paleographer (died 1929)
7 July - Marguerite Audoux, novelist (died 1937)
12 July - Albert Calmette, physician, bacteriologist and immunologist (died 1933)
8 November - René Viviani, politician, Prime Minister (died 1925)

Deaths
16 February - Pierre-Médard Diard, naturalist and explorer (born 1794)
21 February - Pierre-Nolasque Bergeret, painter, lithographer and designer (born 1782)
25 February - Laure Cinti-Damoreau, soprano (born 1801)
30 March - Auguste Bravais, physicist (born 1811)
12 July - Étienne-Jean Delécluze, painter and critic (born 1781)
13 August - Eugène Delacroix, painter (born 1798)
17 September - Alfred de Vigny, poet, playwright and novelist (born 1797)
13 October - Philippe Antoine d'Ornano, Marshal of France (born 1784)
16 November - Louis-René Villermé, doctor and economist (born 1782)
17 December - Émile Saisset, philosopher (born 1814)
30 December - Frédéric Monod, Protestant pastor (born 1794)
Alphonse de Polignac, mathematician (born 1826)

References

1860s in France